The 2004 State of Origin series was the 23rd time that the annual three-game series between the Queensland and New South Wales representative rugby league football teams was contested entirely under 'state of origin' selection rules.

A pre-series Blues mobile phone scandal, Brad Fittler's comeback, a Golden point outcome in Game I and an extraordinary Billy Slater try showed that State of Origin's ability to create memorable football moments was as strong as ever after 25 years of the concept. The New South Wales' Game III victory saw a match-up in the respective cumulative tallies at 35 wins apiece, continuing a recurring trend where any push toward dominance by one side is soon countered by the other. The Ron McAuliffe Medal for Queensland player of the series was awarded to Steve Price.

Game I

New South Wales players Anthony Minichiello and Mark Gasnier were dropped following a drunken incident during the Blues' training camp when it was made public that Gasnier had left a lewd message on a female acquaintance's phone.

Game one featured the first ever Golden point decision in State of Origin football in the very first game where the ruling became available. With scores locked at 8-all and three minutes of extra time played, St George Illawarra Dragons player Shaun Timmins, who had returned to top-class and representative football against unlikely odds after two career-threatening knee injuries and operations, stepped up and kicked a 37-metre left-foot field goal to steal victory for New South Wales. Blues halfback Craig Gower had already missed three earlier field goal attempts, was struggling with a knee injury and was closely marked by Queensland at every kick opportunity so it was left to Timmins to create his own moment of Origin folklore.

Game II
Game II had plenty of hype surrounding it after Blues coach Phil Gould coaxed Brad Fittler out of representative retirement to spearhead the Blues campaign. First game hero Timmins was missing through injury as was Gower and next choice half-backs Trent Barrett and Brett Kimmorley. This left Sydney Roosters number seven Brett Finch to make his Origin debut alongside his club captain Fittler at five-eighth. Matt Orford was somewhat controversially not selected.

Suncorp Stadium proved to be a graveyard for the Blues thanks to one of the greatest Origin tries ever seen. 20-year-old Billy Slater, a former track work jockey who had burst onto the rugby league scene in 2003, stormed onto a Darren Lockyer grubber kick from halfway before chipping over the top of Blues fullback Anthony Minichiello, chasing, regathering and scoring in the same instant.

Game III
Gould gambled by making six changes to the side which had played in game II. 

In Game III, the Blues recalled Trent Barrett to the origin squad who along with Brad Fittler led the Blues to a big win over the Maroons. The match was also the swansong for Phil Gould, New South Wales' most successful Origin coach who had commenced his coaching association with Fittler 14 years earlier at the beginning of their respective coaching and playing careers.

Gould called on six St George Illawarra players for Game III. Debutant centres Mark Gasnier and Matt Cooper dominated on the fringes for the Blues and the class of Fittler and Barrett led them to an emphatic 36-14 victory. Fittler scored the last try in the match in his last ever match for the Blues to the delight of his team-mates.

New South Wales squad

Queensland squad

See also
2004 NRL season

References

External links
2004 State of Origin at sportsphotography.net
State of Origin 2004 at rugbyleagueproject.org

Sources
 Big League's 25 Years of Origin Collectors' Edition, News Magazines, Surry Hills, Sydney

State of Origin series
State of Origin series